United Nations Security Council Resolution 2618 was passed by a unanimous vote on 27 January 2022, which extended the mandate of the United Nations Peacekeeping Force in Cyprus (UNFICYP) until 31 July 2022.

See also
 List of United Nations Security Council Resolutions 2601 to 2700 (2021–present)

References

External links 

 Text of the Resolution at undocs.org

 2618
 2618
2022 in Cyprus
 2618
2020s in Cypriot politics